Ochetostoma is a genus of polychaetes belonging to the family Thalassematidae.

The genus has almost cosmopolitan distribution.

Species:

Ochetostoma arkati 
Ochetostoma australiense 
Ochetostoma azoricum 
Ochetostoma baronii 
Ochetostoma bombayense 
Ochetostoma caudex 
Ochetostoma decameron 
Ochetostoma eaouari 
Ochetostoma erythrogrammon 
Ochetostoma formosulum 
Ochetostoma glaucum 
Ochetostoma griffini 
Ochetostoma hornelli 
Ochetostoma hupferi 
Ochetostoma indosinense 
Ochetostoma kempi 
Ochetostoma kokotoniense 
Ochetostoma maldivense 
Ochetostoma manjuyodense 
Ochetostoma mercator 
Ochetostoma multilineatum 
Ochetostoma natalense 
Ochetostoma octomyotum 
Ochetostoma palense 
Ochetostoma pellucidum 
Ochetostoma punicea 
Ochetostoma senegalense 
Ochetostoma septemyotum 
Ochetostoma stuhlmanni 
Ochetostoma zanzibarense

References

Echiurans
Polychaete genera